Sweet Home is a 2015 Spanish-Polish horror film directed by Rafa Martínez and starring Ingrid García Jonsson and Bruno Sevilla.

Plot 
Alicia, a real estate valuator, decides to occupy a creepy apartment to give a surprise birthday celebration to her boyfriend Simón. The last resident in the building is killed by hooded individuals and Alicia and Simón are assaulted.

Cast

Production 
The screenplay was penned by Rafa Martínez alongside Teresa de Rosendo and Ángel Agudo. A Spanish-Polish co-production, the film was produced by Castelao Pictures (Filmax) and Film Produkcja, with participation of TVE. It was shot in English in Barcelona.

Release 
Distributed by Filmax, the film was theatrically released in Spain on 8 May 2015.

Reception 
Jonathan Holland of The Hollywood Reporter described the watching experience as "enjoyable nonsense", considering that García Jonsson's performance "keeps all the nonsense just about grounded", carrying the film as a "credible and exciting Final Girl" whereas Oriol Tarrida ("The Liquidator") "does a nicely charismatic job of his liquidating".

Sergio F. Pinilla of Cinemanía scored 2½ out of 5 stars, considering that "as energetic as it is reiterative", Sweet Home takes over successful horror film templates (REC, High Tension, Inside), but—bar some cinematography solutions—"fails to break those physical barriers that lead to the fourth dimension of horror".

Jordi Batlle Caminal of Fotogramas rated the film 3 out of 5 stars, and considered that, while warning about taking it seriously, it is "more than enough" with the "attractive production design", an "elegant direction" and a "grand guignol" finale, to the delight of genre fans.

See also 
 List of Spanish films of 2015

References

External links 
 Sweet Home at ICAA's Catálogo de Cinespañol
 

2015 horror films
Spanish horror films
Polish horror films
2010s English-language films
English-language Spanish films
English-language Polish films
Films shot in Barcelona
Home invasions in film
Films set in apartment buildings
2010s Spanish films